Owen Tuohy (25 October 1921 – 8 July 2007) was an Irish fencer. He competed in the individual and team foil events at the 1948 Summer Olympics.

References

External links
 

1921 births
2007 deaths
Irish male foil fencers
Olympic fencers of Ireland
Fencers at the 1948 Summer Olympics
Sportspeople from Dublin (city)
20th-century Irish people